The Chinese characters of Empress Wu, or the Zetian characters, are Chinese characters introduced by Empress Wu Zetian, the only empress regnant in the history of China, in order to demonstrate her power. The characters were not created by the Empress herself, but were suggested by an official named Zong Qinke, the son of one of her cousins, in December, 689 AD. The number of characters varies between 12, 17, 19, or 30. Her subjects were forced to use them during her reign, but they fell into disuse immediately after her death, so they help to determine dates of printed materials.

A few of the surviving characters are preserved in the written histories of Wu Zetian, and a few have found themselves incorporated into modern-day computer standards, classified as either variant or dialect-specific characters.

The form of the characters varies depending on where they are printed.

History
Wu was China's only empress, and she exercised her power by introducing many reforms. In addition to changing the way people dressed, she wanted to change the words people used.

Empress Wu's written reforms resulted in new characters, which were not created from scratch, but borrowed elements of older characters.

Although the characters quickly fell into disuse after the end of Wu's reign, they were recorded in large dictionaries and a few have occasionally appeared as variant characters used in proper names.  For instance, 圀 ('country', 'state') is used to write the name of daimyō Tokugawa Mitsukuni (徳川 光圀) in kanji.  In this context, the character is given the kun'yomi reading kuni as a variant of orthodox characters 国/國 (in shinjitai and kyūjitai, respectively).

Anecdotes about the reign of Empress Wu and the creation of these characters can be read in the Old Book of Tang.

Examples

See also
 A Book from the Sky
 Claudian letters

External links
 More detailed information on these characters (archive link)

References

History of the Chinese script
Tang dynasty culture
Wu Zetian